Dennis Vitolo (born December 18, 1956) is an American former race driver who competed in the CART series.  He raced in the 1988 and 1991-1999 seasons with 36 career starts, including the 1994 Indianapolis 500. He was involved in a crash in that race, taking out reigning CART champion Nigel Mansell in an incident that occurred under caution. The field had slowed and Vitolo ran into the rear of Mansell's car on the warm-up lane between turns 1 and 2. He also raced in the 1997 Indianapolis 500, which by then had become part of the Indy Racing League. His best career CART finish was 7th, in the U.S. 500 at Michigan International Speedway.

Racing record

American Open Wheel racing results
(key)

CART

Indy Racing League

Indianapolis 500

References

External links
 Biography of Dennis Vitolo

1956 births
Living people
American people of Italian descent
Champ Car drivers
Indianapolis 500 drivers
IndyCar Series drivers
SCCA Formula Super Vee drivers
Trans-Am Series drivers
EFDA Nations Cup drivers
People from Massapequa, New York
Racing drivers from New York (state)
U.S. F2000 National Championship drivers

Walker Racing drivers
Bettenhausen Racing drivers
Dale Coyne Racing drivers